The Tallapoosa Commercial Historic District, in Tallapoosa, Georgia, is a  historic district roughly centered on U.S. 78, Head Ave., Odessa St. and the railroad.  It was listed on the National Register of Historic Places in 2016.

Included in the district.

Engineer Charles D. Camp was responsible for the town's 1882 plan.

References

Historic districts on the National Register of Historic Places in Georgia (U.S. state)
National Register of Historic Places in Haralson County, Georgia